João Nicolau de Melo Breyner Moreira Lopes GOIH GOM (30 July 1940 – 14 March 2016), better known as Nicolau Breyner, was a Portuguese actor, screenwriter, producer, director and television host. He was one of the most well-known figures in Portuguese television and cinema, having performed in more than 170 films and television series in his career.

Early life
Nicolau Breyner was born in Serpa, Portugal, on 30 July 1940. His parents were Nicolau Moreira Lopes (1915–1965) and Augusta Pereira da Silva de Melo Breyner Pereira (1920–2003).

Breyner and his family moved to Lisbon when he was 9 years old. There he studied at the Camões Secondary School. He studied singing and was part of the Portuguese Musical Youth chorus.  He first enrolled in a Law school but later switched to vocal studies at the Conservatório Nacional. He initially pursued opera singing, but opted for theater after finding that he did not have the discipline required for opera.

Career
Breyner's acting debut in theater was in the play Leonor Telles by Marcelino Mesquita.

Personal life 
Breyner's first marriage was to Mafalda Maria de Alpoim Vieira Barbosa. His second marriage was to the Portuguese actress Sofia Sá da Bandeira, between 1996 and 2001. He had two daughters, Mariana and Constança Fidalgo Ramos de Melo Breyner Lopes, from a previous relationship with Cláudia Fidalgo. His third wife was Mafalda Gomes de Amorim Bessa.

Breyner was a second cousin of Portuguese author Sophia de Mello Breyner Andresen.

Death 

Breyner died in Lisbon from a cardiac arrest on 14 March 2016, aged 75. His body was cremated at the Alto de São João Cemetery in Lisbon.

Selected filmography

References

External links
 

1940 births
2016 deaths
Portuguese male film actors
20th-century Portuguese dramatists and playwrights
People from Serpa
Portuguese people of German descent
20th-century Portuguese male actors
20th-century Portuguese male writers
21st-century Portuguese male actors
Portuguese male dramatists and playwrights